Kazuhiko Takamatsu (born 11 August 1964) is a Japanese luger. He competed at the 1988 Winter Olympics, the 1992 Winter Olympics and the 1994 Winter Olympics.

References

1964 births
Living people
Japanese male lugers
Olympic lugers of Japan
Lugers at the 1988 Winter Olympics
Lugers at the 1992 Winter Olympics
Lugers at the 1994 Winter Olympics
Sportspeople from Hokkaido